Shaula Vogue (born 28 August 1986) is an American radio and television presenter, DJ and former fashion model raised in Honolulu and, as of 2020, living in Japan. She hosts Power of Music on InterFM and cohosts Design Talks Plus (NHK E and NHK World-Japan) and Biz Stream (NHK World-Japan), as well as her own podcast Greenhouse Radio with Shaula.

Vogue debuted in 2007 in TV Tokyo's late night programme Aloha Girl. Soon she started appearing in fashion magazines such as ViVi and Glitter and participating in events as Kobe Collection and Tokyo Girls Collection. She also debuted in radio in 2008 on Chiba's Bay FM.

Since late 2021 she is represented by Cent. Force through its ZONE section. She used to be represented by Ryo Izuno's agency Office R.

Media appearances

Current

Radio
Power of Music~Imakoso Kikitai Ongaku~, InterFM, Tokyo (Mon. to Fri.) (2022–)

Television
Biz Stream, NHK World-Japan (Sat.)
Design Talks Plus, NHK-E Tele (Thu.) / NHK World Japan (Wed.)
Love Music, Fuji TV (Sun.)

Podcast
 Greenhouse Radio with Shaula (since May 2021)
 Bucket List -Driven by Dreams- powered by Porsche Japan (since December 2021)

Past

Radio
Blue Ocean, Tokyo FM, Tokyo (one-off appearance, 17 August 2021)
Tokyo Morning Radio, J-WAVE, Tokyo (filling for main announcer Tetsuya Bessho, 1-4 March 2021)
Omotesandō-Ao 10th Anniversary Presents Oshare Life, InterFM, Tokyo (Sat.) (2017–2018; 2018–2019; 2019–2020, 2020–2021)
Sonic Radio, InterFM, Tokyo (Mon.) (until 2020)
Ready Steady George, with George Williams, InterFM, Tokyo (Mon.-Thu., live; simulcast between July 2019 and March 2020 on Radio NEO, Nagoya)  (2014–2020)
Sky Gate Travelling Groove, Bay FM, Chiba (Fri., broadcast live from Narita International Airport) (2011–2019)
FLY! DAY TRIPPER～FROM SKY GATE～TRIP1, Bay FM, Chiba (Fri. live from Narita Airport) (2008–2010)
Good Times Boo!, InterFM, Tokyo, December 2013

Television
DRESS tv. (May 2013 – March 2014, MBS）
TOKYO BRANDNEW DAYS〜Ashita no Watashi〜 (November 2013, BS Japan)
Tokyo Jōkyū Date (Tokyo Precious Dating), 25 September 2013, TV Asahi (episode 71, Takadanobaba)
Chikyū TV El Mundo, April 2011 – March 2012, NHK BS1 (presenter on Tuesdays)
3D★3D "Miryoku Saihakken! 3D de Toru Hawaii", October 2011, BS Fuji
Sasuke Rising and Sasuke Rising Chokuzen Nabi, TBS
Sekai Baribari Value (MBS)
Aloha girl（April – September 2007, TV Tokyo）

Personal life 
Born to an American father and a Japanese mother, Vogue grew up in Manoa, Honolulu, where she attended St. Francis High School. She had previously spent time in Ashibetsu, Hokkaido with her mother.

Vogue lives in Tokyo. She announced in 2017 in her blog she had married.

References

External links 
Official website at Cent. Force
Former official website at Office R
Official blog
Old blog
@Shaula_Vogue at Instagram
@Shaula_Vogue at Twitter
Official Facebook page

American models of Japanese descent
Japanese announcers
Japanese female models
Japanese people of American descent
American radio DJs
American television hosts
1986 births
Living people
American women television presenters